Somna may refer to  the following places :

 Sømna, a municipality in Nordland county, central Norway
 Somna State, a former princely state in British India